S class may refer to:

Automobiles
 Mercedes-Benz S-Class, an automobile
 S-segment, a European vehicle size class

Locomotives
 Victorian Railways S class, Australian steam locomotives
 Victorian Railways S class (diesel), Australian diesel locomotive
 South Australian Railways S class, steam  locomotives
 WAGR S class, Australian steam locomotives

Ships
 S-class destroyer (disambiguation), multiple types of ships
 S-class submarine (disambiguation), multiple types of submarines
 S-class ferry, operated by BC Ferries in British Columbia, Canada
 S-class torpedo boat, ex-Russian torpedo boats operated by Finland
 , a class of the Holland America Line

See also
 Class S (disambiguation)
 S-Type (disambiguation)
 Type S (disambiguation)